Julien Valéro (born 23 February 1984) is a French former professional footballer who played as a striker. During his career, he played for Caen, Nîmes, Sète, Beauvais, Quevilly and Luçon.

Career
Born in Perpignan, Valéro's family moved to Granville, Manche when he was young. He began playing professional football with Caen in the north of France, where his size (1.87 meters) made him a formidable striker. After starting at Caen, Valéro spent most of his career in the lower levels of French football. His finest moments were during Quevilly's historic run to the 2012 Coupe de France Final. Valéro scored four goals for Quevilly during the competition, including one in the quarter-final against Olympique de Marseille played at his former club's Stade Michel d'Ornano.

References

External links

 

1984 births
Living people
Sportspeople from Perpignan
French people of Spanish descent
French footballers
Association football midfielders
Stade Malherbe Caen players
Nîmes Olympique players
FC Sète 34 players
AS Beauvais Oise players
US Quevilly-Rouen Métropole players
Luçon FC players
Ligue 1 players
Ligue 2 players
Championnat National players
Association football forwards
Footballers from Occitania (administrative region)